David Phillips (born 14 August 1987 in Kingston upon Hull, England) is a British professional ice hockey defenceman, currently playing for Elite Ice Hockey League (EIHL) side Sheffield Steelers. Phillips was previously with Dunaújvárosi Acélbikák in the Erste Liga.

Playing career
Phillips began his career within the Kingston upon Hull club in England, playing for Kingston Crunch under-16, Kingston Predators under-19 and then Kingston Jets of the English National League in November 2003. He then moved up to the Hull Stingrays in the British National League, a team which joined the Elite League in 2006. Phillips established himself as one of Britain's top defencemen and served as assistant captain of the Stingrays in the 2007–08 season. He moved to the Belfast Giants for the 2008–09 season, becoming new coach Steve Thornton's first signing. Establishing a career high 25 points in 54 games, Phillips helped the Giants to be crowned Champions of the Challenge Cup and Knockout Cup.

On 28 April 2009, Phillips re-signed to remain with the Giants for the following season. However, with NHL ambitions, and following an impressive performance in a Chicago Blackhawks evaluation camp, Phillips was signed to a two-way contract with American Hockey League affiliate team, the Rockford IceHogs on 12 July 2009. He participated on an invitation in the Blackhawks training camp, before returning to the IceHogs to begin the 2009–10 season. After making his North American debut against the Peoria Rivermen on 4 October 2009, Phillips was briefly loaned to ECHL team Toledo Walleye, scoring his first North American professional goal, before he was recalled to the IceHogs to remain for the majority of the season posting 6 assists in 52 games.

On 8 April 2010, it was confirmed that Phillips had agreed to a one-year deal with fellow AHL team, the Chicago Wolves for the 2010–11 season. Phillips was then assigned to the Walleye of the ECHL to begin the 2010 season. After appearing in one game with the Wolves in November he was returned to Toledo. With only five points in 31 games with the Walleye, on 12 November, Phillips was reassigned by the Wolves to fellow ECHL team, the Gwinnett Gladiators. On 25 December, Dave was released from his contract with the Wolves and shortly joined fellow AHL team, the Lake Erie Monsters, on a professional try out on 5 January 2011. After posting three assists in 10 games with the Monsters, Phillips returned to the Gladiators. Towards the end of his first stint with the Monsters, Phillips signed with Australian-based team, the Adelaide Adrenaline, for the forthcoming 2011 season on 12 January 2011.

On 10 May 2011, it was announced that Phillips would be returning to Britain and the Elite Ice Hockey League with the Coventry Blaze.

After the Hull Stingrays announced they would not take part in the 2015–16 season, who Phillips was to play for, it was made public that the newly reformed Manchester Storm along with Matty Davies would sign both players for the coming season.

In 2016, Phillips signed with the Sheffield Steelers, remaining with the team until 2020. However, following the suspension of the 2020-21 Elite League season, Phillips signed abroad for a third time after agreeing to join Hungarian Erste Liga side Dunaújvárosi Acélbikák.

In February 2021, Phillips moved to Sweden to sign for Hockeyettan side Karlskrona HK. Later that month, Phillips signed for UK NIHL side Sheffield Steeldogs ahead of their Spring Cup series, before returning to the Sheffield Steelers in time for the 2021 Elite Series.

Career statistics

Regular season and playoffs

International

References

External links
 
 David Phillips' profile and statistics from the Belfast Giants
 

1987 births
Living people
Adelaide Adrenaline players
Belfast Giants players
British National League (1996–2005) players
Chicago Wolves players
Coventry Blaze players
Dunaújvárosi Acélbikák players
English ice hockey defencemen
Gwinnett Gladiators players
Hull Stingrays players
Lake Erie Monsters players
Manchester Storm (2015–) players
Sportspeople from Kingston upon Hull
Rockford IceHogs (AHL) players
SønderjyskE Ishockey players
Toledo Walleye players
Sheffield Steelers players
British expatriate ice hockey people
English expatriate sportspeople in Australia
English expatriate sportspeople in Hungary
English expatriate sportspeople in the United States
English expatriate sportspeople in Denmark
Expatriate ice hockey players in Hungary
Expatriate ice hockey players in Latvia
Expatriate ice hockey players in the United States
Expatriate ice hockey players in Australia